Canna Italian Group 'Roma' is a tall aquatic Italian Group cultivar, equally at home as a water marginal or in the border; large green foliage, oval shaped, white margin, upright habit; round stems, coloured green & purple; flowers are open, yellow with orange blotches, throat red-orange, staminodes are large, edges lightly frilled, stamen is orange-red, petals red, fully self-cleaning; seed is sterile, pollen is low fertile; rhizomes are long and thin, coloured white and pink; tillering is prolific. Introduced by C. Sprenger, Dammann & Co., Naples, Italy, EU in 1898.

Gallery

Synonyms
 Canna 'Cattleya' - sometime used as a synonym for Canna 'Italia' as well.
 Canna 'Florence Vaughan' - this name belongs to a totally different Crozy Group cultivar.
 Canna 'Golden Eagle'
 Canna 'Heinrich Seidel' - this name belongs to a totally different cultivar.
 Canna 'Jennifer'
 Canna 'Madame Crozy' - this name belongs to a totally different Crozy Group cultivar.
 Canna 'Mrs Cozy'
 Canna 'Orange Humbert'
 Canna 'Orange King Humbert'
 Canna 'Papillon'
 Canna 'Sunburst'
 Canna 'Yellow King Humbert' - this name belongs to a totally different cultivar.

See also
 Canna
 List of Canna species
 List of Canna cultivars
 List of Canna hybridists

References
 Revue Horticole, André, 1898, Trois Nouveaux Cannas Italiens

Cannaceae
Ornamental plant cultivars